Paolo Mauricio Lemos Merladett (born 28 December 1995) is a Uruguayan professional footballer who plays as a centre-back for Campeonato Brasileiro Série A club Atlético Mineiro. He has also been capped by the Uruguay national team.

Club career

Defensor
Born in Rivera, Lemos was a Defensor Sporting youth graduate. On 6 January 2014, aged 18, he was promoted to the main squad.

Lemos made his professional debut on 11 May 2014, starting in a 2–1 home loss against Montevideo Wanderers. After appearing in only two matches during his debut campaign, he was more regularly used in his second; however, his appearances were limited due to an apendicitis and call-ups to the under-20 national team.

Rubin Kazan
On 3 July 2015, Lemos was loaned to Russian Premier League side FC Rubin Kazan, for one year. He made his debut for the club on 3 August, playing the full 90 minutes in a 1–0 away defeat to Spartak Moscow.

After appearing in eight matches for the club (four in the league), Lemos was bought outright.

Las Palmas
On 28 January 2016, Lemos was loaned to La Liga side UD Las Palmas, with a buyout clause. He made his debut in the competition on 20 February, coming on as a second-half substitute for Jonathan Viera in a 1–2 home loss against FC Barcelona.

On 6 May 2016, after appearing in nine matches for the Amarillos, Lemos signed a permanent five-year deal with the club effective in July. He scored his first goal in the main category of Spanish football the following 30 January, netting his team's second in a 3–1 home win against Valencia CF.

On 10 March 2017, Lemos scored a brace in a 4–3 away win against RCD Espanyol.

Sassuolo (loan)
On 22 January 2018, Las Palmas announced they had reached an agreement with Italian club Sassuolo for the loan of Lemos.

Fenerbahçe
On 26 August 2020, Fenerbahçe announced the signing of Lemos on a three-year contract.

Beerschot  (loan)
On 31 August 2021, Lemos was loaned to Belgian club K Beerschot VA for the 2021–22 season.

Atlético Mineiro
On 16 February 2023, Lemos joined Brazilian club Atlético Mineiro on a ten-month deal.

International career
Lemos has represented Uruguay with the U23 team at 2015 Pan American Games, winning the gold medal.

He received maiden call-up to senior team in October 2017 and was included in the squad to play friendlies against Poland and Austria. He made his debut on 10 November 2017, playing 90 minutes in a 0–0 draw against Poland.

Career statistics

Club

Honours
Uruguay U23
Pan American Games: 2015

References

External links

Living people
1995 births
People from Rivera Department
Uruguayan footballers
Association football defenders
Defensor Sporting players
FC Rubin Kazan players
UD Las Palmas players
U.S. Sassuolo Calcio players
Fenerbahçe S.K. footballers
K Beerschot VA players
Clube Atlético Mineiro players
Uruguayan Primera División players
Russian Premier League players
La Liga players
Serie A players
Segunda División players
Süper Lig players
Belgian Pro League players
Uruguay under-20 international footballers
2015 South American Youth Football Championship players
Pan American Games gold medalists for Uruguay
Footballers at the 2015 Pan American Games
Uruguayan expatriate footballers
Uruguayan expatriate sportspeople in Russia
Uruguayan expatriate sportspeople in Spain
Uruguayan expatriate sportspeople in Turkey
Uruguayan expatriate sportspeople in Belgium
Uruguayan expatriate sportspeople in Brazil
Expatriate footballers in Russia
Expatriate footballers in Spain
Expatriate footballers in Turkey
Expatriate footballers in Belgium
Expatriate footballers in Brazil
Pan American Games medalists in football
Medalists at the 2015 Pan American Games